A Kiss to Build a Dream On is a 2008 studio album by Jessica Molaskey, and her first with the pure jazz Arbors label. It’s named for the song composed by Bert Kalmar, Harry Ruby and Oscar Hammerstein II in 1935, and recorded by Louis Armstrong in 1951.

It pays tribute to, as Molaskey refers to in the liner notes "various sized pieces of wood with strings attached." It features her husband John Pizzarelli, Bucky Pizzarelli, Martin Pizzarelli, and Aaron Weinstein in this vein.

Other tracks include show tunes, old standards, and two originals written by Molaskey and John Pizzarelli.

Reception 

The album is among the highest rated of her works on AllMusic with four and a half stars. Music critic Ken Dryden concluded that "Molaskey will warm an audience of any size with this superb release."

Christopher Loudon from the JazzTimes compared the album favorably to her Broadway performances, saying "a singing actress who can fully transport her stage skills to the recording studio, transforming each selection into a multihued mini-play."

Stephen Holden wrote for the New York Times the "album of happy songs ... is so buoyant it eliminates any hint of Sunday school sermonizing from the concept of sweetness and light."

Writing for Playbill, Steven Suskin praised the "canny song selection, impeccable musical instincts, and an unconditional love for the material."

Track listing

Personnel 
 Jessica Molaskeyvocals
 John Pizzarelliguitar, vocal duets (track 6, 10)
 Bucky Pizzarelliguitar
 Aaron Weinsteinviolin
 Larry Fullerpiano (track 10)
 Martin Pizzarellibass

References

External links 
 
 
 

2008 albums
Jessica Molaskey albums